This is a List of the Bangla Academy Literary Award recipients from 2000 to 2009.

2000
None

2001
 Kaysul Haque (poetry)
 Shamsuzzaman Khan (essay-research)
 Ali Imam (juvenile literature)

2002
 Zahidul Haque (poetry)
 Mobarak Hossain Khan (research)
  (juvenile literature)

2003
 Abdul Hye Sikder (poetry)
 Saeed-Ur-Rahman (research)
 Musharraf Karim (juvenile literature)

2004 
 Amjad Hossain (novel)
 Mojammel Hossain Mintu (short story)
 Asaddor Ali (research)
  (translation)
 Muhammed Zafar Iqbal (science)
 Faridur Reza Sagar (juvenile literature)

2005
 Muhammad Zafar Iqbal (science)
 Rezauddin Stalin (poetry)
 Mokbula Manzoor (novel)
 Abul Kalam Mohammed Zakaria (research)
 Fakhruzzaman Chowdhury (translation)

2006
Shamsul Islam (poetry)
 Haripada Datta (novel)
 Ali Anwar (essay)
 Muhammad Ibrahim (science)
 Mannan Hira (drama)
  (juvenile literature)

2007 
 Manzoore Mawla (poetry)
 Jatin Sarker (essay-research)
 Lutfor Rahman Riton (juvenile literature)

2008 
 Mahbub Sadik (poetry)
 Karunamaya Goswami (essay-research)
 Helena Khan (juvenile literature)

2009 
6 persons were awarded.
 Arunabh Sarkar (poetry)
 Rabiul Hussain (poetry)
 Anwara Syed Haq (folk literature)
 Abul Ahsan Chowdhury (research)
 Rafiqul Haque (juvenile Literature
 Sushanta Majumder (literature)

References

Bengali literary awards
Bangladeshi literary awards
Lists of award winners
Civil awards and decorations of Bangladesh